The Lijiatuo Yangtze River  Bridge is a cable-stayed bridge over the Yangtze River in Chongqing, China. The bridge carries four lanes of traffic between the Banan District south of the Yangtze River and the Jiulongpo District to the north.

In the summer of 2013 the bridge was closed for five days as its steel cables were replaced.  In December 2014 the city government approved another replacement of the bridge's cables.

See also
List of largest cable-stayed bridges
Yangtze River bridges and tunnels

References

 

Bridges in Chongqing
Bridges over the Yangtze River
Cable-stayed bridges in China
Bridges completed in 1995